Marseillan is the name of three communes in France:

 Marseillan, Gers, in the Gers département
 Marseillan, Hérault, in the Hérault département
 Marseillan, Hautes-Pyrénées, in the Hautes-Pyrénées département